Wajid Shah (born 20 November 1999) is a Hong Kong cricketer. In November 2019, he was named in Hong Kong's squad for the 2019 ACC Emerging Teams Asia Cup in Bangladesh. He made his List A debut for Hong Kong, against Bangladesh, in the Emerging Teams Cup on 14 November 2019.

References

External links
 

1999 births
Living people
Hong Kong cricketers
Place of birth missing (living people)